Sandy Northrop is a producer, director, and editor whose documentaries have been shown on PBS. Wind & Stars Production Group  is the bannerhead under which she produces. Her contributions to over 25 PBS productions have taken her all over the world. Vietnam Passage: Journeys from War to Peace, a trilogy on post war Vietnam, premiered on PBS, and won national recognition.

Early work
Making movies has taken Northrop all over the world. Among her many assignments was working for the National Geographic Society in Africa as location manager and editor on two acclaimed television specials. Last Stand in Eden covered the plight of endangered elephants in Kenya. Gorillas, explored Rwanda's mountain gorillas.

Current projects
Northrop is also a recognized authority on American editorial cartoons. In 1996 she co-authored Drawn & Quartered, with Steven Hess on the history of American editorial cartoons and their impact on political and popular culture. The book grew out of two NEH grants. An updated version of the book will be published in Summer, 2009. She combined her love of filmmaking and political cartoons to produce two segments for The NewsHour with Jim Lehrer on the 2004 presidential race as seen by the cartoonists. Northrop followed The Economist's Kevin Kallaugher who was making the transition for two-dimensional to three dimensional caricatures. The resulting film, The World According to Kal, was featured in Mightier Than the Sword: The Satirical Pen of Kal, at the Walters Art Museum in Baltimore the summer of 2006. Northrop also curated a retrospective on United States Presidential Elections, 1796–2008, as covered by editorial cartoonists, for the Newseum in 2007.

Work in Vietnam
In 1997 Northrop moved to Hanoi, Vietnam. While there she produced, directed, shot and edited Vietnam Passage: Journeys from War to Peace, a trilogy of three one-hour television specials on post war Vietnam. These programs which premiered on PBS offer an intimate view of the changes that have taken Vietnam forward from the ashes of a devastating war to the opportunities for peace.
Assignment Hanoi, the first program, told the story of Pete Peterson, who having survived six years as a POW in the “Hanoi Hilton” during the war and was returning to Vietnam as the United States' first Ambassador since 1975. The second program, Vietnam Passage: Journeys from War to Peace highlighted the Vietnamese perspective on the “American” War and its aftermath. The Next Generation, the final program in the trilogy, focused on eight Vietnamese kids, born during or just after the war and their hopes for the future. The Library of Congress recently selected Next Generation for its permanent collection.

Other production
Northrop spent eight years producing the historical montages that have become the signature for PBS's National Memorial Day and A Capitol Fourth live concert celebrations.

Education
Northrop graduated from Stanford University's Masters documentary program  in 1972. She received a BFA in photography from the University of Michigan in 1969.

Living people
Stanford University alumni
American film producers
American film directors
Penny W. Stamps School of Art & Design alumni
Year of birth missing (living people)
American film editors